Dewas Junior was established by Jivaji Rao I Puar in 1728 during the Maratha conquest of Central India. It was a 15 Gun Salute Maratha princely state.
On 12 December 1818, it became a British protectorate.

History

The original state was founded in 1728 by Jivaji Rao, from the Puar clan of Marathas who together with his older brother (Tukoji) had advanced into Malwa with Peshwa Baji Rao, as part of the Maratha Conquest.

The brothers divided the territory among themselves; their descendants ruled as the junior and senior branches of the family. After 1841, each branch ruled his own portion as a separate state, though the lands belonging to each were intimately entangled; in Dewas, the capital town, the two sides of the main street were under different administrations and had different arrangements for water supply and lighting.

Both Dewas states were in the Malwa Agency of the Central India Agency. After India's independence in 1947, the Maharajas of Dewas acceded to India, and their states were integrated into Madhya Bharat, which became a state of India in 1950. In 1956, Madhya Bharat was merged into Madhya Pradesh state.

Dewas Junior Darbar (Court) was composed of Sardars, Mankaris, Istamuradars, Thakurs and Jagirdars.

Rulers 

Colonel HH Maharaja Sir Yeshwant Rao Puar had two daughters, 'Durgaraje' (d/o Padmaraje) who married into the Sardar Phalke family of Gwalior and 'Udayaraje' (d/o Maneka Raje) who married the Raja of Prayagpur.

See also
 List of Maratha dynasties and states
 List of Indian princely states

References

Dhar district
Princely states of Madhya Pradesh
Princely states of Maharashtra
States and territories disestablished in 1948
1728 establishments in India
1948 disestablishments in India
Dewas district
History of Madhya Pradesh